Simcoe West was an electoral riding in Ontario, Canada. It was created in 1875 from Simcoe North. It was abolished in 1925 before the 1926 election. It was re-established in 1987 and finally abolished in 1999.

Members of Provincial Parliament

References

Notes

Citations

 

Former provincial electoral districts of Ontario